The Crucial Matter is a 2020 Nigerian gospel film written and directed by Gbenga Awoyemi and  produced by Supo Ayokunle under the sponsorship of Nigerian Baptist Drama Association (NIBDRA). The movie stars faith-based movie actors and actresses such as Kolade Segun-Okeowo, Kayode Babalola, Bose Ann Olufayo, Rotimi Amodu and Sam Odusolu.

Synopsis 
The movie addresses indiscipline and recklessness that exist in the society which is in tandem with the Christian belief.

Premiere 
The movie was premiered at Molete Baptist Church, Ibadan  on the 8 March 2020.

Cast 

 Kolade Segun-Okeowo,
 Kayode Babalola,
 Bose Ann Olufayo,
 Rotimi Amodu,
 Sam Odusolu,
 Yemi Adepoju,  
 Adeyinka Aderibigbe

References 

2020 films
Nigerian drama films
English-language Nigerian films